Alfred Campbell Garrioch (February 14, 1848 – December 2, 1934) was an Anglican priest and author who lived in Manitoba, Canada.

He was born in Portage la Prairie, Manitoba in 1848. In 1866 he married Agnes Bertha Crabbe and together they raised 12 children. He studied theology at St. John's College in 1869.

He was ordained as an Anglican priest serving in Peace River in Manitoba. In 1885, while working in England he translated several books into the Beaver language as well as creating an English-Beaver and Cree dictionary. He also wrote some autobiographical works, including First Furrows in 1923 and The Correction Line in 1933. He died in Winnipeg in 1934.

Works
 First Furrows, (1923)
 The Far And Furry North, (1925)
 A Hatchet Mark In Duplicate, (1929)
 The Correction Line, (1933)
 
Source:

References

External links
 

1848 births
1934 deaths
Canadian Anglicans
Linguists of Na-Dene languages
Writers from Manitoba